Léopards de Transfoot is a football club based in Madagascar, playing in the Malagasy Second Division.

In 2003, the team won the Coupe de Madagascar. The team plays at the Barikadimy Stadium.

Achievements
Coupe de Madagascar: 2003

Performance in CAF competitions
2004 CAF Confederation Cup: 1 appearance

Notable players
Jimmy Radafison
Mazinot Valentin

References

External links
Footballdatabase.eu
Fr.allafrica.com

Football clubs in Madagascar